The Portland vice scandal (sometimes called the vice clique scandal, the vice crusade in contemporary reports, or inaccurately the YMCA scandal) refers to the discovery in November 1912 of a gay male subculture in the U.S. city of Portland, Oregon. Nearly 70 men were charged, and three were convicted by jury; the Oregon Supreme Court then reversed the convictions on legal technicalities.

Beginnings
At the time the scandal broke, Oregon's sodomy law merely said, "If any person shall commit sodomy or the crime against nature, either with mankind or beast, such person, upon conviction thereof shall be punished by imprisonment in the penitentiary not less than one year nor more than five years." Up to this point, in some U.S. states with sodomy laws similar to Oregon's, courts had ruled that these statutes covered anal sex, but not oral sex. These cases cited the 1817 English case Rex v. Jacobs, Russ & Ry 331.

Following the arrest and interrogation of a teenager for shoplifting, he told his interrogators that "he had been 'corrupted' by a number of men in town."

The teenager was identified variously as fourteen-year-old Hazen Wright for shoplifting or nineteen-year-old Benjamin Trout. The person identified as the perpetrator was Harry Rowe, 39, who lived at the local YMCA, which had the ninth largest membership of all YMCAs in North America.

This revelation prompted police investigations and led to the arrest of 69 men "for crimes ranging from so-called indecent acts to sodomy."
The press used the term "vice clique" to refer to these men collectively. Since a crime against nature such as this could not be consensual, the parties are described as predators and victims or "boy victim", though only categorized by which participant was older.

Some members of the vice clique were prominent public figures including Edward McAllister, as well as lawyers and physicians. Some of the accused lived at the local YMCA and which was supported by members of Portland's upper class. Considered "unprintable" content, it still prompted attacks against the YMCA, its sponsors, and the city's upper class, especially by the working-class newspaper The Portland News and its editor Dana Sleeth.

Members of the vice clique

Theodore Kruse and the Louvre
The scandal also exposed Theodore Kruse and the Louvre restaurant in Portland, which he had owned.

Kruse (February 13, 1864, Germany – November 3, 1941, Gearhart, Oregon) started in Portland with the Kruse Grill around 1891. He married his second wife, Marion F. in Spokane, Washington in 1906 and divorced in 1908. He then purchased the Louvre restaurant, running it and Portland's Belvedere Hotel starting around 1907. He was married to his third wife, Marie E. Daggett, at the time. While in the process of setting up Hotel Carlton in 1911, he disappeared mysteriously in August 1911, days before a large payment was due to Gevurtz Furniture Company for the Carlton, who formed a company and took over the hotel lease. This was front-page news in the Oregonian; a month later, his wife sent people to Seattle to look for him, and the Oregonian described him as surfacing there with a young man. He suddenly reappeared on March 24, 1912, at the Carlton.

In April 1912 his third wife was granted divorce from him, citing his "cruel and inhuman treatment" (a common grounds for divorce before no-fault divorce was legal). She described him as flirting with clientele at his restaurant in 1911 before his disappearance, and recounted that he was first in Quebec, then she sent a stepson (from his previous marriage) to Europe and found him in Germany. He stated his wife had died and he had retired. He then traveled through Europe (Monte Carlo, Naples, Rome), before suddenly reappearing.

The Louvre was described as having an "immoral atmosphere" and on a list of eight "gay refectories" in Portland in 1911 by a local judge. It had a mens-only dining room. By 1912 it was linked to the clique, especially Kruse and Rigó. Kruse then closed the Louve and opened the Rainbow Grill in October 1913, which advertised "fat, juicy, delicious" oysters and a "Special Men's Grill" with meat of the diner's choosing. It closed in June 1915.

Gypsy Rigó
The clique also exposed Hungarian violinist popular in Portland, Rigó Jancsi (known as "Gypsy" Rigó), described by The Oregonian as  "violin virtuoso, gipsy of romance, gay Lothario." He had played at the Louvre, perhaps starting in 1909, then was caught in the clique in the November 1912 events. Rigó had previously been embroiled in scandal, eloping with Clara Ward, Princesse de Caraman-Chimay despite still being married to her first husband. The marriage didn't last, as Rigó continued with his "insatiable and well-publicized appetite for women". This also helped clear him of the vice charges.

Edward McAllister 
One of the most prominent members of the vice clique was Edward Stonewall Jackson McAllister, a Portland attorney, Progressive activist, leader in the state Democratic Party, and friend of William Simon U'Ren and C.E.S. Wood.

During his trial, The Morning Oregonian would report that he was charged with committing an "immoral act."
According to the written opinion in State v. The indictment merely stated that his charge was "commit[ting] the crime against nature," which was "too well understood and too disgusting to be herein more fully set forth." But Oregon Supreme Court justice Charles McNary, in his dissent in McAllister, shed more light on the matter:

A warrant for McAllister's arrest was issued . According to a contemporary news report in The Morning Oregonian, he was in Marshfield (now called Coos Bay) on that day, "taking depositions in a legal case." Furthermore, he "was incensed when he heard the nature of the charge that had been lodged against him" and professed his innocence.
He denied his identity, but several people in Medford recognized him. He claimed he was headed to Ashland to meet with his law partner, but "authorities believe[d] he was trying to leave the state."

In McAllister's trial, Judge John P. Kavanaugh permitted testimony of acts of sodomy allegedly committed by McAllister with people other than Kadel, "for the purpose of showing mental disposition and casting light on the probability of the committal of the act actually charged." Men testified he was known as "Mother McAllister" at Lownsdale Square, a gay cruising site. The defense argued that these testimonies infringed upon McAllister's constitutional rights.
In charging the jury, Kavanaugh gave the following instruction:

The defense would later argue on appeal, successfully, that Kavanaugh made a prejudicial error in giving his personal opinion to the jury rather than stating only matters of law.

McAllister made a closing argument for the defense on his own behalf, described as "an eloquent plea", wherein "he charged that he [was] the victim of a conspiracy."
On , the jury convicted him, but recommended "leniency in punishment."
On , he was sentenced to one to five years in the state penitentiary, the maximum sentence called for by statute. Notice of appeal to the Oregon Supreme Court was immediately filed.

Others
Others associated with the clique included William H. Allen, who attempted to commit suicide with chloroform at the YMCA following the exposure, Horace Tabb, physician Harry Start (and witness Robert Ray), clerk and bookkeeper Edward Wedemeyer, George Birdseye, Fred A. Clark, Alonzo "Billy" E. Ream (1856-1930), Earle Van Hulen, Fred Rodby, George Parker, Earl Taylor, Kenneth Hollister, Will Phelps, Horace Tabb (at the Multnomah Hotel) and Lionel Deane. Claude Bronner and Nathan Healy lived with each other at 1731 S.W. Taylor; Healy turned on Bronner, who served time. John Moffitt, a photographer, was caught in the scandal and then advertised his services as "Photographer of Men".

Responses

Community response
Discussing the scandal, a letter to the editor in the Portland News said "If these degenerating practices were committed by Greeks or Hindus, these lily whites... would be in favor of drowning them in the Willamette [River]." Boag also compares the scandal to a 1894 article in the Evening Telegram, which described "One of the most atrocious crimes ever committed in this city... a big stalwart negro named Fred Jones, a scowdweller...", showing the racist and working-class biases in the city.

Legislative response

Walter Lafferty, Portland's U.S. Representative, vowed to bring the scandal to Washington's attention, though his efforts were short-lived.

The Oregon state legislature responded to the scandal by amending the state's sodomy law via House Bill 145 (1913). The law was clarified and broadened to include "any act or practice of sexual perversity," including fellatio. At the time, courts had previously ruled that sodomy laws similar to Oregon's did not cover oral sex, and it was believed that convictions based on oral rather than anal sex acts might be reversed. Also under H.B. 145, the maximum sentence for sodomy in the state penitentiary was tripled, from five years to fifteen.

As urged by Governor Oswald West, the legislature also passed H.B. 69 (1913), a law to authorize sterilization of "sexual perverts" and "moral degenerates,"
which were defined as "those addicted to the practice of sodomy or the crime against nature, or to other gross, bestial and perverted sexual habits and practices prohibited by statute."

People opposed to sterilization, including Catholic clergymen and reformers such as William Simon U'Ren, formed the Anti-Sterilization League and successfully forced a referendum on this legislation. Oregon voters repealed it by a vote of 56 percent to 44 in November 1913. However, the legislature passed a similar law in 1917.

Action by the Oregon Supreme Court 
The three men who were sentenced to the state penitentiary appealed their convictions — Harry Start, Edward Wedemeyer, and Edward McAllister.
The Oregon Supreme Court first heard Start's case in May 1913 and reversed the conviction in State v. Start, 65 Or 178, 132 P 512 (1913), finding that the trial judge had allowed extraneous testimony that possibly prejudiced the jury. Wedemeyer's conviction was also reversed around that time. McAllister's convictions were reversed on the same grounds in November 1913. Justice Charles McNary, a future U.S. Senator, was a new court justice by the time McAllister's appeal was heard. McNary wrote the dissent for McAllister's case, which was emotionally charged and "revealed a deeply seated personal discomfort with same-sex eroticism." Days later McAllister was expelled from the Multnomah Bar Association. In 2000, over 74 years after his death, he was reinstated to the Bar.

Notably, these convictions were not reversed on the basis that oral sex was not covered under Oregon's sodomy law, as the legislature feared the court might rule. In fact, despite legislation previous to Start ensuring that fellatio counted as a "crime against nature," the court ruled that this was necessarily true because, among other reasons, the mouth and anus are both openings of the alimentary canal and therefore equally unsuited to sexual intercourse.

See also

 Rigójancsi
 Boise homosexuality scandal
 Newport sex scandal

References

Bibliography 
 

1910s in LGBT history
1912 in Portland, Oregon
LGBT culture in Portland, Oregon
LGBT history in Oregon
Scandals in Oregon
Sex scandals in the United States